Orwin is both a surname and a given name. Notable people with the name include:

Clifford Orwin (born 1947), Canadian academic
John Orwin (born 1954), English rugby union player
Martin Orwin (born 1963), English linguist and writer
Orwin Castel (born 1973), Mauritian footballer

See also
Orwin, Pennsylvania, census-designated place in Schuylkill County, Pennsylvania, United States